Thakur Rajendrasingh Baghel (24 October 1945 – 29 April 2021)  was an Indian politician.

Biography
He was elected to the Madhya Pradesh Legislative Assembly from the Hatpipliya Assembly constituency for three non-consecutive terms.

Baghel died from COVID-19 in April 2021, at the age of 75.

Political career
Rajendrasingh ran for the Hatpipliya Assembly constituency seat 6 times and was victorious thrice.

References

|-

|-

Madhya Pradesh MLAs 1985–1990
Madhya Pradesh MLAs 1993–1998
Madhya Pradesh MLAs 2003–2008
Indian National Congress politicians from Madhya Pradesh
1945 births
2021 deaths
People from Dewas
People from Dewas district
Deaths from the COVID-19 pandemic in India